is a Japanese manga series written and illustrated by Tsuya Tsuya. It was serialized in Nihon Bungeisha's Manga Goraku Special magazine from February 2019 to December 2020.

Publication
Nihon Bungeisha collected its chapters in three tankōbon volumes, released from November 9, 2019, to January 29, 2021.

In North America, the manga was licensed for English release by Seven Seas Entertainment and released under its Ghost Ship mature imprint. The first volume was released on August 17, 2021.

Volume list

See also
Mikazuki ga Waratteru, another manga series by the same author
Rakujitsu no Pathos, another manga series by the same author
Futari no Ouchi, another manga series by the same author

References

Erotic romance anime and manga
Nihon Bungeisha manga
Seinen manga
Seven Seas Entertainment titles